This is a list of the best selling singles, albums and as according to IRMA. Further listings can be found here.

Top-selling singles
"Impossible" – James Arthur
"Somebody That I Used to Know" – Gotye featuring Kimbra
"We Are Young" – fun. featuring Janelle Monáe
"Tiny Dancer - A Song for Lily-Mae" – Various Artists
"Call Me Maybe" – Carly Rae Jepsen
"Starships" – Nicki Minaj
"Titanium" – David Guetta featuring Sia
"Beneath Your Beautiful" – Labrinth featuring Emeli Sandé
"Wild Ones" – Flo Rida featuring Sia
"Next to Me" – Emeli Sandé

Top-selling albums*
Notes:
''Take Me Home – One Direction+ – Ed Sheeran 
Our Version of Events – Emeli Sandé
Born to Die – Lana Del Rey
21 – Adele
Up All Night – One Direction 
Unapologetic - Rihanna
Babel - Mumford & Sons
Christmas - Michael Bublé3'' - The ScriptNotes:'''
 *Compilation albums are not included.

References 

2012 in Irish music
2012